Samantha Giancola (born March 1987), also known as Sammi Sweetheart, is an American television personality. She is best known as one of the eight main cast members in the MTV reality series Jersey Shore.

Early life 

Raised in Hazlet, New Jersey, Giancola is of Italian and Greek descent. She attended Raritan High School, where she played softball, ran track, and was a four-year varsity soccer letter winner. Giancola won art contests when she was younger.

She went on to major in sociology at William Paterson University, where she also played as a midfielder on their Division III women's soccer team.

Career

Jersey Shore 
Giancola debuted on the MTV reality show Jersey Shore in August 2009. She has since appeared with her cast mates on The Tonight Show with Jay Leno, The Ellen DeGeneres Show, The Wendy Williams Show, and Live with Regis and Kelly. Giancola and her Jersey Shore co-stars appeared in the 2012 film The Three Stooges. She later appeared on some episodes of Snooki & Jwoww and participated in the 2017 E! special Reunion Road Trip: Return to the Jersey Shore.

In 2018, Giancola announced she would not return for the Jersey Shore reboot, Jersey Shore: Family Vacation, to avoid "potentially toxic situations" and to focus on her "businesses and relationship".

In 2023, Giancola announced she would be returning to Jersey Shore after an 11 year hiatus.

Other ventures 
In 2011, Giancola endorsed a fragrance called Dangerous, which is available for both men and women. She later endorsed another fragrance, Dangerous Desires.

In 2013, Giancola launched her online clothing and accessories line, Sweetheart Styles.

In 2015, Giancola became a co-host on the podcast called Just Sayin, where she joins relationship expert Siggy Flicker and TV host Clare Galterio to discuss their respective personal lives and celebrity rumors. The podcast is made in New York City through the Loud Speakers Network. The podcast ran for 104 episodes from August 2015 to November 2017.

Filmography

Film

Television

References

External links 
 
 

1987 births
Living people
People from Hazlet, New Jersey
American people of Greek descent
American people of Italian descent
Participants in American reality television series
American women's soccer players
Sportspeople from Monmouth County, New Jersey
Soccer players from New Jersey
Women's association football midfielders
William Paterson Pioneers women's soccer players